This is the List of municipalities in Kırıkkale Province, Turkey .

Municipalities and mayors 
List is sorted alphabetically A-Z, as Districts->Municipalities.

References 

Geography of Kırıkkale Province
Kirikkale